Stemberger is a surname. People with the surname include:

Gerhard Stemberger (born 1947), Austrian psychotherapist
Günter Stemberger (born 1940), Austrian professor for Judaic studies
Julia Stemberger (born 1965), Austrian actress
Katharina Stemberger (born 1968), Austrian actress

German-language surnames